The , often shortened to simply Budokan, is an indoor arena located in Chiyoda, Tokyo, Japan. It was originally built for the inaugural Olympic judo competition in the 1964 Summer Olympics.  While its primary purpose is to host martial arts contests, the arena has gained additional fame as one of the world's most outstanding musical performance venues. The Budokan was a popular venue for Japanese professional wrestling for a time, and it has hosted numerous other sporting events such as the 1967 Women's Volleyball World Championship. Most recently, the arena hosted the Olympic debut of karate in the 2020 Summer Olympics, as well as the judo competition at both the 2020 Summer Olympics and the 2020 Summer Paralympics.

A number of famous rock music acts have played at the Budokan. The Beatles were the first rock group to play there in a series of concerts held between June 30 and July 2, 1966. ABBA ended their last tour and final live performance there in March of 1980. Numerous acts have recorded live albums at the Budokan, including Blur, Bryan Adams, Bob Dylan, Tom Petty, Eric Clapton, Cheap Trick, CNBLUE, Dream Theater, Duran Duran, Kiss, Europe, Morrissey, Ozzy Osbourne, Judas Priest, Paul McCartney, Asia, Ringo Starr, Journey, Deep Purple, Masayoshi Takanaka, X-Japan, MSG, and Pink Floyd.

Location
The Nippon Budokan is located in Kitanomaru Park in the center of Tokyo, two minutes' walking distance from Kudanshita Subway Station, and near the Imperial Palace and Yasukuni Shrine. The 42 m (140 ft) high octagonal structure holds 14,471 people (arena seats: 2,946, 1st floor seats: 3,199, 2nd floor seats: 7,846, standee: 480). The building is modeled after Yumedono (Hall of Dreams) in Hōryū-ji in Nara.

Venue history

Martial arts

Although the Budokan also functions as a venue for big musical events, its primary purpose is for Japanese martial arts. The national championships of the different branches of major martial arts (judo, kendo, karate, aikido, etc.) are held annually at the Budokan. The Budokan has also been associated with professional wrestling's big shows, typically from All Japan Pro Wrestling and Pro Wrestling Noah. However, due to declining audiences following the death of Mitsuharu Misawa and the retirement of Kenta Kobashi, professional wrestling has ceased running regular shows in the Budokan. During Wrestle Kingdom 12, New Japan Pro-Wrestling announced that its yearly G1 Climax tournament's finals would be held at the Budokan.

The Muhammad Ali vs. Antonio Inoki hybrid rules fight held at the Budokan in 1976 is seen as a forerunner to mixed martial arts. K-1, Shooto and Pride Fighting Championships have all held events at the arena.

Music

The Beatles were the first rock group to perform at the Budokan in a series of five shows held between June 30 and July 2, 1966. Their appearances were met with opposition from those who felt the appearance of a western pop group would defile the martial arts arena.

In July 1973, Japanese television recorded the Santana performance at the Budokan.

The Budokan gained worldwide fame when American artists Cheap Trick and Bob Dylan used the arena to record their performances, Cheap Trick at Budokan (1978) and Bob Dylan at Budokan (1979). The venue is popular for recording live albums because it has good acoustics, is relatively large and Japanese audiences are known for being highly appreciative when appropriate but quiet during performances. Eric Clapton described the Tokyo audience as "almost overappreciative" in interviews promoting Just One Night (1980), his own live album recorded at the Budokan.

American crossover thrash band Stormtroopers of Death released a live album titled Live at Budokan (1992), though the title was in jest and the album was recorded at famed New York City venue The Ritz.

The original Beatles concert is heavily bootlegged on audio and video; the first night's concert video was officially released by Apple Records in Japan only as Beatles Concert at Budokan 1966, and excerpts are shown in The Beatles Anthology, while the second Anthology album included the first show's performances of "Rock and Roll Music" and "She's A Woman". The venue is one of the stages in The Beatles: Rock Band video game. Chatmonchy currently holds the record for the largest crowd at the Budokan.

The record for the most Budokan music concerts is held by Eikichi Yazawa, 142 times as of December 19, 2017. 

Artists that have released live recordings from the venue include:

1970s
 Led Zeppelin; September 23 and 24, 1971 and October 2 and 3, 1972.
 Chicago; June 8, 1972.
 Uriah Heep; 1973, (Live concert filmed on 16mm for television. DVD versions available)
 Deep Purple; 1972; for the last of the three concerts making up their Made in Japan live album.
 The Moody Blues; January 18, 1974
 The Carpenters; June 7–9, 1974; Live in Japan
 Focus; June 20, 1975
 Queen; 1975, 1976, and 1979.
 Rainbow; December 16, 1976; On Stage Rainbow performed here both afternoon and evening shows at 3:00 pm and 6:00 p.m.
 Aerosmith; 1977 (Jan-Feb); see the Japanese bootleg CD Rocks Budokan (label Calm&Storm).
 Fleetwood Mac; December 5, 1977 and February 3, 4th and 5, 1980
 Bay City Rollers; 1977; released as Rollerworld: Live at the Budokan 1977 in 2001.
 Pink Lady; 1977 (Bye Bye Carnival) and 1979 (Live in Budoukan).
 Kiss; 1977 and 1978.
 Cheap Trick; April 27, 28 and 30, 1978; Cheap Trick at Budokan (and the later-released 1998 album at Budokan: The Complete Concert).
 Ian Gillan Band; 1977–1978; Live at the Budokan (Vols. 1–2).
 Eric Clapton; December 1979; Just One Night.
 Diana Ross; 1977; "An Evening with Diana Ross" concert was videotaped during her 1977 tour.
 Julie Andrews; 1977 "An Evening with Julie Andrews" concert was part of a highly acclaimed sold out national tour of Japan by Julie Andrews
 Eikichi Yazawa; 1977; Super Live Nippon Budokan, recorded his Budokan concerts of 1977.
 Devo; 1979 "The Men Who Make the Music" Japanese TV broadcast. A clip of "Red Eye Express" from this show is included in The Men Who Make The Music home video.
 Gregg Allman Band and Cher ; June 29, 1977
 Bob Dylan; 1979; Bob Dylan at Budokan, recorded during his 1978 world tour.
 Electric Light Orchestra; 1978.
 Earth, Wind & Fire; 1979.
 Boston; 1979

1980s
 Sadao Watanabe; 1980; How's Everything.
 ABBA; 1980;
 Momoe Yamaguchi; 1980; Budokan at Last
 Yellow Magic Orchestra; 1980; Live at Budokan 1980, recorded 1980, released 1993.
 Masayoshi Takanaka; 1981; Rainbow Goblins Story / Live At Budokan, released 1986
 Queen; 1981; "The Game Tour". 1985; "The Works Tour".
 The Police; 1981; Budokan Radio On, released 1988.
 Michael Schenker Group; 1981; One Night at Budokan, released in 1982, deluxe edition released in 2009
 John Denver, 1981
 Quincy Jones; 1981; Quincy Jones Live at the Budokan.
 Journey; 1982; "Escape Tour". 1983; "Frontiers Tour".
 Styx; 1982;
 Kitarō; 1982; Live at Budokan.
 Toto; 1982; Live at Budokan 1982, Toto IV Tour.
 Japan; 1982; Live from the Budokan 1982, Final Tour (Some songs included Yellow Magic Orchestra members Yukihiro Takahashi and Ryuichi Sakamoto).
 Spinal Tap; 1982; "Smell The Glove Tour".
 Dave Grusin; 1983; Dave Grusin and the NY-LA Dream Band
Grover Washington Jr., Pieces of A Dream; 1983; Aurex Jazz Festival 
 Michael Schenker Group; 1982; One Night at Budokan.
 Asia; 1983; Live at Budokan, Asia in Asia.
 Willie Nelson; 1984, February 23rd, Live At Budokan
Gary Moore; 1984; We Want Moore! during the Victims of the Future tour in 1984, remastered 2002 (Budokan was one of the 4 or 5 different venues where this album was recorded)
 Frank Sinatra; 1985; Live at the Budokan Hall, Tokyo
 Phil Collins; 1985; The No Jacket Required World Tour
 Corey Hart; 1985
 Momoko Kikuchi; 1985; "Advanced Domestic Tour Budokan"
 Judas Priest; 1986; "Fuel for Life Tour"
 Iron Maiden; 1987, "Somewhere on tour"
 Dead or Alive; 1987 video Rip It Up Live (VHS/Laserdisc)
 Pink Floyd; March 2 & 3, 1988; "A Momentary Lapse of Reason Tour"
 Kiss; 1988; "Crazy Nights Tour"
 Miho Nakayama; May 11, 1989; Whuu!! Natural Live at Budokan '89
 Stryper 1989; "In God We Trust tour

1990s
 X Japan; 1990; Rose & Blood Tour
 Seiko Matsuda - Precious Moment ~1990 Live at Budokan~
 X Japan; 1991
 Loudness - Live Loudest at the Budokan '91
 B'z - Just Another Life (1991).
 Debbie Gibson - Live In Tokyo: The Possibilities World Tour
 X Japan; 1992; Extasy Summit 1992
 Tin Machine; 1992; who recorded a portion of Tin Machine Live: Oy Vey, Baby, during the It's My Life Tour.
 Skid Row - Live at Budokan, Tokyo 1992.
 Diana Ross, Tokyo 1992; 'The Force Behind the Power World Tour'
 X Japan; 1993
 The Doobie Brothers; 1993; Live at Budokan.
 Aerosmith; 1994; Get a Grip Tour
 Yngwie Malmsteen; 1994; video Live at Budokan 94, VHS/DVD.
 Blur; 1995–6; recorded a live compilation CD, Live at the Budokan, in 1995, at the height of Britpop; it was released in 1996.
 Princess Princess; May 31, 1996; The Last Live
 Chic; 1996; performance later released as Live at the Budōkan (1999). This was bassist Bernard Edwards's last performance; he died the next day.
 Gloria Estefan; 1997; “Evolution Tour”
 Diana Ross; 1996; 'Take Me Higher World Tour'
 Prince; 1996 Prince performed four concerts during the year as the Artist formerly known as Prince. 
 Mr. Big; 1997; recorded Live at Budokan in 1997
 Oasis; 1998; Oasis performed three nights in a row during their 'Be Here Now tour'
 Puffy; 1998; Recorded Jet Tour '98 in support of the album Jet-CD
 Malice Mizer; 1998; two night stint at the Budokan in support of Merveilles, which yielded their live video Merveilles ~Shuuen to Kisuu~ L'Espace
 Journey; 1998; Recorded several songs from their Frontiers Tour in 1983 at the Budokan which was included on their live album Greatest Hits Live
 Lauryn Hill; 1999; The Miseducation Tour (two sold-out shows)
 Janet Jackson; 1999; The Velvet Rope Tour (five sold-out shows)
 Faye Wong; 1999; Budokan Live (for further information see: Faye Wong#1999: Venturing into Japan)

2000s
 Bryan Adams; 2000; Live at the Budokan.
 Morning Musume; 2000; DVD Morning Musume First Live at Budōkan: Dancing Love Site 2000 Haru (Also Sayaka Ichii's graduation from the group)
 Malice Mizer; 2-night stint at the Budokan in support of Bara no Seidou, which yielded their live video Bara ni Irodorareta Akui to Higeki no Makuake.
 Bay City Rollers; 2001; Rollerworld, Live at the Budokan 1977, released as Rollerworld: Live at the Budokan 1977 in 2001.
 Ozzy Osbourne; 2002; filmed CD/DVD combination Live at Budokan.
 Pearl Jam; 2003; recorded an official bootleg at Budokan during their Riot Act Tour (for further information see: Pearl Jam#Riot Act: 2002–2005).
 Duran Duran; July 11 + 12, 2003; played at Budokan; shows recorded live
 Mariah Carey; 2003; performed three concert shows, part of her Charmbracelet World Tour on July 6, 8 and 10.
 Incubus; March 3, 2004; performed at Budokan and show recorded as CD Live in Japan 2004 on June 1, 2004
 Dream Theater; 2004; 2DVD/3CD Live at Budokan.
 Hikaru Utada; July 28, 2004; video Utada Hikaru in Budokan 2004: Hikaru no 5.
 Beastie Boys; January 14, 2005.
 Judas Priest; 2005; DVD Rising in the East.
 Nana Mizuki; 2005; DVD Nana Mizuki Live Rainbow at Budokan.
 Avril Lavigne; 2005; DVD Live at Budokan: Bonez Tour, Bonez Tour.
 Hikaru Utada; 2006; video Utada United 2006 (Hikaru Utada discography#Video Releases)
 Nana Mizuki; 2006; DVD Nana Mizuki Livedom -Birth- at Budokan.
 MUCC; 2006; DVD World Tour Final Nippon Budokan 666
 Morning Musume; 2006; DVD Morning Musume Concert Tour 2006 Aki: Odore! Morning Curry
 The Gazette; 2006; DVD Standing Live Tour 2006 [Nameless Liberty. Six Guns...] Tour Final at Nippon Budokan.
Ai; 2006; video; Nippon Budokan Ai
 TM Network; 2007; video TM Network -Remaster- at Nippon Budokan 2007.
 TVXQ; 2007; Tohoshinki 2nd Live Tour 2007: Five in the Black.
 Syrup16g; March 1st, 2008; The Last Day of Syrup16g.
 Perfume; 2008; "Budokaaaaaaaaaan!!!!!".
 Joe Hisaishi; 2008; Joe Hisaishi in Budokan – 25 years with the Animations of Hayao Miyazaki.
 Flow; 2008; Flow Live Tour 2007–2008 'Isle' Final at Nippon Budokan
 Chatmonchy; 2008; [Restaurant Main Dish] Live at : Budokan 2008.
 Kishidan; 2009; 氣志團現象2009 AGAIN AND AGAIN DVD
 Nana Mizuki; 2009; Blu-ray/DVD Nana Mizuki Live Diamond x Fever.
 MUCC; 2009; DVD -MUCC Live Chronicle 3 "Kyutai" in Nippon Budokan-
 Mr. Big; 2009; live CD/DVD Back to Budokan.
 AKB48; 2009; AKB104 Senbatsu Members Sokaku Matsuri
 The Pillows; 2009; live DVD Lostman Go to Budokan.

2010s
 Dir En Grey; January 9–10, 2010; live DVD Uroboros: With the Proof in the Name of Living... At Nippon Budokan.
 An Cafe; January 14, 2010; King of Harajuku Dance Rock.
 Backstreet Boys; February 18, 2010; recorded live DVD Backstreet Boys: This Is Us Japan Tour 2010 on the This Is Us Tour.
 Nico Touches the Walls; March 12, 2010; "Walls is Auroras" LIVE.
Polysics; March 14, 2010; Budokan or Die!!!! 2010.3.14
 One Ok Rock; 2010; live DVD This Is My Budokan?!.
 Taylor Swift; February 26 & 27, 2011; Speak Now World Tour
 Morning Musume; 2011; Ai Takahashi's graduation concert "Ai Believe ~Takahashi Ai Graduation Memory Special~.
 F.T. Island; 2011; Live in Budokan 'Summer Mesengger Tour'.
 MUCC; 2011; live DVD Chemical Parade
 Vivid January 7, 2012; Take Off: Birth to the New World
 Judas Priest; February 16 & 17, 2012; Epitaph World Tour
 2PM; 2012; 2PM Six Beautiful Day Live in Budokan
 Milky Holmes; 2012; Milky Holmes Live in Budokan
 Lee Seung-gi; 2012; First Japan Live in Budokan Kidou (Hope).
 T-ara; 2012; Live in Budokan, recording of a concert performed as part of their Jewelry Box tour
 Dream Morning Musume; March 10, 2012; Dream Morning Musume Special Live 2012 Nippon Budokan~Dai 1 Shou Shuumaku 'Yuusha tachi, Shuugou seyo'''
 U-KISS; 2012; live DVD U-KISS Live in Budokan.
 Morning Musume; 2012; Risa Niigaki and Aika Mitsui's graduation concert Ultra Smart.
 Scandal; March 28, 2012; Japan Title Match Live 2012: Scandal vs Budokan Sonar Pocket; August 3, 2012; Sonapokeizm Special - Natsu no Jin - in Nippon Budokan Acid Black Cherry; 2012; "Live DVD Acid Black Cherry Tour 『2012』"
 Princess Princess; November 23, 2012; Princess Princess Tour 2012: Saikai at BudokanAi; December 5, 2012; Independent Tour 2012 - Live in Budokan Spyair; December 18, 2012;
 Morning Musume; 2013; Reina Tanaka's graduation concert, Michishige☆Eleven Soul °C-ute; 2013; Queen of J-Pop ~Tadoritsuita Onna Senshi~ AKB48; 2013; AKB48 Group Rinji Soukai "Shirokuro tsukeyou janai ka!" T-ara; 2013; T-ara Japan Tour 2013: Treasure Box Morning Musume; 2013; ~Chance!~ Berryz Kobo; 2013; Berryz Koubou 10 Shuunen Kinen Budokan Special Live ~Yappari Anata Nashi de wa Ikite Yukenai~ AKB48 Group Research Students; 2013; AKB48 Group Kenkyuusei Concert ~Oshimen Hayai Mono Gachi~ Super Junior KRY; 2013; Special Japan tour Super Junior K.R.Y. Special Winter Concert Mamoru Miyano; October 4, 2013; MAMORU MIYANO SPECIAL LIVE 2013 ～TRAVELING!～ first male voice actor to uphold a one-man show in Budokan
 LiSA; January 3, 2014; Live Is Smile Always - Kyo mo Ii Hi Da - In Nippon Budokan Avril Lavigne; February 4 and 5, 2014: The Avril Lavigne Tour
 Babymetal; March 1 and 2, 2014 ; Live at Budokan: Red Night & Black Night Apocalypse Dir En Grey; March 8–9, 2014; Dum Spiro Spero at Nippon BudokanAi; March 26, 2014; Moria Gatchai Masita in Budokan S/mileage; July 15, 2014; S/mileage Live 2014 Natsu Full Charge ~715 Nippon Budokan~ Junho (from 2PM); August 12 and 13, 2014; "Feel" Solo Tour in Japan 2014 Dish; January 1, 2015
 LiSA; January 10 and 12, 2015; LiVE is Smile Always - PiNK & BLACK - in Nippon Budokan Silent Siren; January 17, 2015; Silent Siren Live Tour 2014–2015 Fuyu ~Budokan e Go! Siren Go!~ at Budokan Oldcodex; February 11, 2015; "Capture" in Budokan Mamoru Miyano; 2015; MAMORU MIYANO LIVE TOUR 2015 ～AMAZING!～ final at Budokan
 Kalafina; February 28, 2015; Kalafina Live Best 2015 "Red Day". March 1, 2015; Kalafina Live Best 2015 "Blue Day" The Gazette; March 3, 2015; 13th Anniversary Nippon Budokan Judas Priest; March 11, 2015; Redeemer of Souls Tour Kana-Boon; March 31, 2015
 Morning Musume; May 27, 2015; ~Gradation~.
 己龍 (Kiryu); July 31, 2015
 Hatsune Miku; September 4–5, 2015; Magical Mirai.
 Eir Aoi; November 2, 2015; Eir Aoi Special Live 2015 World of Blue at Nippon Budokan Angerme; November 29, 2015, Angerme First Concert Tour 2015 Aki "Hyakka Ryouran" ~Fukuda Kanon Sotsugyou Special~ Morning Musume; December 7–8, 2015; ~Prism~.
 Dish; January 1–2, 2016; 4 Monkey Magic.
 Wagakki Band; January 6, 2016;  Wagakki Band Daishinnenkai 2016 Nippon Budokan: Akatsuki no Utage.
 Scandal; January 12–13, 2016; SCANDAL ARENA TOUR 2015–2016 「PERFECT WORLD」 Mamoru Miyano; 2016; MAMORU MIYANO LIVE TOUR 2015-16 ～GENERATING!～ final at Budokan
 Dir En Grey; February 5–6, 2016; Arche at Nippon Budokan iKon; February 15–16, 2016; iKoncert 2016: Showtime Tour Symphogear; February 27–28, 2016; Symphogear Live 2016 YuiKaori; March 12, 2016; RAINBOW CANARY!! ～Brightest Stage～ Shouta Aoi; March 13, 2016; Wonder Lab. ~Bokutachi no Sign~ CNBLUE; May 26-27, 2016; Spring Live 2016, We’re Like A Puzzle @Nippon Budokan Aya Uchida; August 13, 2016; AYA UCHIDA Complete LIVE 〜COLORS〜 in Nippon Budokan Kalafina; September 16–17, 2016; Kalafina Arena LIVE 2016 Queen + Adam Lambert; September 21–23; Queen + Adam Lambert 2016 Summer Festival Tour Suzuko Mimori; October 27–28, 2016; Mimori Suzuko Live Tour 2016 "Grand Revue" Final at Nippon Budokan Eir Aoi; November 4–5, 2016; Eir Aoi 5th Anniversary Special Live 2016 ～Last Blue～ at Nippon Budokan My First Story; November 18, 2016; We're Just Waiting 4 You Tour 2016 Final at Budokan Journey; February 7, 2017; recorded live CD/DVD Live in Japan 2017 ClariS; February 10, 2017; ClariS 1st Budōkan Concert ~Futatsu no Kamen to Ushinawareta Taiyō~ (ClariS 1st Budōkan Concert: Two Masks and the Lost Sun)
 Versailles; February 14, 2017; Chateau de Versailles at Nippon Budokan The Oral Cigarettes; June 16, 2017; Unofficial Dining Tour 2017 at Nippon Budokan Taemin; July 1–2, 2017; TAEMIN The 1st Stage Nippon Budokan Blackpink; July 20, 2017, Japanese Debut Showcase After the Rain; August 9–10, 2017; AtR -Clockwise / Anti-Clockwise- Poppin'Party (BanG Dream!); August 21, 2017; BanG Dream! 4th☆LIVE Miracle PARTY 2017! Aimer; August 29, 2017; Aimer Live in Budokan "blanc et noir" Dream Theater; September 11, 2017; Back to Budokan 2017 Nana Mizuki; January 11–21, 2018; NANA MIZUKI LIVE GATE 2018 Kalafina; January 23, 2018; Kalafina 10th Anniversary LIVE 2018 at Nippon Budokan coldrain; February 6, 2018; FATELESS JAPAN TOUR 2017 Nogizaka46; April 22, 2018; Rina Ikoma Graduation Concert @ Nippon Budokan (生駒里奈 卒業コンサート ＠日本武道館) Winner; April 28, 2018; WINNER Japan Tour 2018 ~We'll always be young~ Mariah Carey; October 31 and November 1, 2018; #1's Tour (two sold-out shows)
 Maaya Uchida; January 1, 2019; UCHIDA MAAYA New Year LIVE 2019「take you take me BUDOKAN!!」 (sold-out concert)
 Ensemble Stars!; January 13, 2019; Ensemble Stars! Starry Stage 2nd ～in Nippon Budokan～ Milky Holmes; January 28, 2019; Milky Holmes Final Live Q.E.D. Janet Jackson; February 10 and February 11, 2019; State of the World Tour (two sold-out shows)
Aimyon;February 18, 2019; Aimyon Budokan -1995- Roselia, Raise A Suilen, and Poppin'Party (BanG Dream!); February 21–23, 2019; BanG Dream! 7th☆LIVE Inori Minase; June 28–29, 2019; Inori Minase LIVE TOUR 2019 Catch the Rainbow! Official Hige Dandism; July 8, 2019; Official HIGE DANdism one-man tour 2019 @ Nippon Budokan Polkadot Stingray; July 17, 2019; Polfest 45 " #Uchoten One-man" Nippon Budokan (Tokyo)

2020s

 Wagakki Band; January 3–4, 2021; Daishinnenkai 2021 Nippon Budokan: Amanoiwato
Babymetal;  2021; 10 Babymetal Budokan
 Yoasobi;  December 4–5, 2021; Nice to Meet You
 Wagakki Band; January 9, 2022; Daishinnenkai 2022 Nippon Budokan: Yasoukenbunroku
 Momoiro Clover Z; May 15, 2022; MOMOIRO CLOVER Z 6th ALBUM TOUR “Shukuten”
 Onew; July 7-8, 2022; Onew Japan 1st Concert Tour ~Life Goes On~
 Lee Jun-ho; August 20-21, 2022; Lee Junho 2022 Fan-Con <Before Midnight>
  Eve; August 29-30, 2022; Kaizin Live Tour
 Yorushika; February 8-9, 2023; Zense LIVE 2023
Megadeth; February 27, 2023; reunited with former guitarist Marty Friedman for a one-off, global livestream concert performance. This was Friedman's first performance with the band in 23 years. Friedman left Megadeth in 2000 and relocated permanently to Japan.

Other events
The National Memorial Service for War Dead is held with the attendance of the Prime Minister, the Emperor and the Empress annually in Budokan on August 15, the day of Japan's surrender.

As well as holding the Live Concert in appreciation of the Popular Anime series Lucky Star: Live in Budokan (Anata No Tame Dakara).

A concert was held in honor of Studio Ghibli's 25th anniversary at the Budokan, hosted by Joe Hisaishi. It included repertoire from most of the films Hisaishi composed for Hayao Miyazaki's Studio Ghibli filmography.

Diana Ross performed and taped her "Here and Now" television special in 1991 to a sold-out audience.

The Japan Record Awards took place in the arena from 1985 to 1993 where all of the artists from around the country receive these awards.

Muhammad Ali won a unanimous decision over Mac Foster in their 1972 heavyweight boxing match.

On February 13, 1975, a religious gathering was held to hear Rev. Sun Myung Moon speak.

On August 27, 2011, Japan's three biggest professional wrestling promotions; All Japan Pro Wrestling, New Japan Pro-Wrestling and Pro Wrestling Noah came together to produce a charity event titled All Together at the arena. On August 10, 11 and 12, 2018 New Japan Pro-Wrestling held the final 3 days of the G1 Climax in the Budokan, which marked the first time in 15 years that New Japan has promoted an event there. New Japan once again returned to the arena for the final 3 days of the 2019 G1 Climax. New Japan also held the Best of the Super Jr. and World Tag League finals in December 2021, as well as their 49th Anniversary Show and the final two days of the upcoming G1 Climax in 2021.
 
Joshi wrestling promotion World Wonder Ring Stardom held their All Star Dream Cinderella event on March 3, 2021. Making this the first time a joshi company to held a event in the venue in 24 years.

Professional wrestler and legend in Japan Kenta Kobashi wrestled his final match in Budokan on May 11, 2013, at an event titled Final Burning in Budokan. Kobashi is synonymous with the arena along with fellow wrestlers Toshiaki Kawada and the late Mitsuharu Misawa.

In November, the Budokan is a two day-venue for the annual Japan Self-Defense Forces Marching Festival, a yearly tradition and the nation's military tattoo first held here in the fall of 1963. Aside from JSDF bands, foreign armed forces military bands are also invited to join the event.

The state funeral of Shinzo Abe was held at the Budokan on 27 September 2022.

Other uses
The Nippon Budokan is the primary setting of the 1989 fighting game Budokan: The Martial Spirit. Players train in various Japanese martial arts, and must then face off at the Budokan arena against computer-controlled opponents.

A fictional concert hall based on the Nippon Budokan appeared in the music video game Guitar Hero III: Legends of Rock (2007) under the name "Kaiju Megadome". The Beatles' appearance at Nippon Budokan was featured in The Beatles: Rock Band (2009).

Another fictional hall based on the Nippon Budokan appeared in the Japanese pro-wrestling video game Virtual Pro Wrestling 2: Ōdō Keishō'' (2000).

See also 
 List of indoor arenas in Japan

References

External links

 Nippon Budokan official website 
 Nippon Budokan Map
 1964 Summer Olympics official report. Volume 1. Part 1. pp. 128–30.

Basketball venues in Japan
Sports venues in Tokyo
Culture in Tokyo
Indoor arenas in Japan
Music venues in Tokyo
Dōjō
Sports venues completed in 1964
Venues of the 1964 Summer Olympics
Venues of the 2020 Summer Olympics
Olympic judo venues
Olympic karate venues
Boxing venues in Japan
Buildings and structures in Chiyoda, Tokyo
1964 establishments in Japan